Thomas Roe is an American retired ice hockey Center and Defenseman who was the NCAA Scoring Champion in 1962–63.

Career
Roe was a three-year varsity player for Williams. His appearance on the team saw the Ephs jump from a 5–14 record up to a 16–4 mark, setting a program record for points in a season (67) along the way. Because Williams did not play a sufficiently strong schedule, however, the team was not in consideration for the NCAA Tournament. As a junior Roe led the nation in goal scoring with 49 and was named to the inaugural All-ECAC Second Team. Williams finished fourth in the conference with a 16–3–1 record but were not ranked in the top 8 and were left out of the ECAC Tournament. As a senior, Roe continued to score in bunches, finishing as the nation's top scorer, however, Williams' record declined to 13–9 and the team had no opportunity to demonstrate how good their best player was. Roe finished his college career as William's all-time leading scorer with a host of individual program records, many he still possesses (as of 2020).

After graduating, Roe joined the US National Team for the 1964–65 season. He participated in the 1965 Ice Hockey World Championships as a defenseman and scored three goals for a team that finished a disappointing 6th.

Career statistics

Regular season and playoffs

International

Awards and honors

References

External links

1934 births
Living people
Ice hockey players from Minnesota
American ice hockey centers
American men's ice hockey defensemen
Williams College alumni